Psilocarphus oregonus is a species of flowering plant in the family Asteraceae known by the common names Oregon woollyheads and Oregon woolly marbles. It is native to western North America from Washington and Idaho to Baja California, where it grows in seasonally wet habitat, such as vernal pools.

Description
This is a small annual herb producing several stems just a few centimeters long which are coated in silvery or woolly fibers. The leaves are linear or lance-shaped and up to 2 centimeters long. The inflorescence is a small, spherical flower head only about half a centimeter wide. It is a cluster of several tiny woolly disc flowers surrounded by leaflike bracts but no phyllaries. Each tiny flower is covered in a scale which is densely woolly with long white fibers, making the developing head appear cottony.

References

External links
Jepson Manual Treatment
USDA Plants Profile
Photo gallery

Gnaphalieae
Flora of the West Coast of the United States
Flora of British Columbia
Flora of Baja California
Flora of California
Flora of Oregon
Flora of the Cascade Range
Flora of the Great Basin
Flora of the Klamath Mountains
Flora of the Sierra Nevada (United States)
Natural history of the California chaparral and woodlands
Natural history of the California Coast Ranges
Natural history of the Central Valley (California)
Natural history of the Channel Islands of California
Natural history of the Peninsular Ranges
Natural history of the San Francisco Bay Area
Natural history of the Santa Monica Mountains
Natural history of the Transverse Ranges
Flora without expected TNC conservation status